National Tertiary Route 407, or just Route 407 (or ) is a National Road Route of Costa Rica, located in the Cartago province.

Description
In Cartago province the route covers Cartago canton (Corralillo, Quebradilla districts).

References

Highways in Costa Rica